Yamini Singh may refer to:

 Yamini Singh (Bollywood actress) (born 1971)
 Yamini Singh (Bhojpuri actress) (born 1996)